Bothrogonia is a genus of leafhoppers with a large number of species distributed across the Old World. They can be told apart from others in their tribe by the pattern of setae on the hind tibia.

References 

Hemiptera of Asia
Cicadellidae genera
Cicadellini